Holy Bowl may refer to:

 An annual football game between Central Catholic Marianist High School and Holy Cross High School San Antonio.
 An annual football game between Jesuit High School, Sacramento and Christian Brothers High School, Sacramento
 An annual football game between Providence Christian Academy of Lilburn, Georgia and Hebron Christian Academy of Dacula, Georgia. See: Holy Bowl (Georgia)

An annual High School Football Game in San Diego. Cathedral Catholic High School Vs the All-Boys Catholic High School Saint Augustine.